Buol (also, Bwool, Boeol) is a village in Tinombo Selatan district, Parigi Moutong Regency, Central Sulawesi, Indonesia.

References

Populated places in Central Sulawesi